Hurricane Hernan was fourth and final tropical cyclone to strike Mexico at hurricane intensity during the 1996 Pacific hurricane season. The thirteenth tropical cyclone, eighth named storm, and fifth hurricane of the season, Hernan developed as a tropical depression from a tropical wave to the south of Mexico on September 30. The depression quickly strengthened, and became Tropical Storm Hernan later that day. Hernan curved north-northwestward the following day, before eventually turning north-northeastward. Still offshore of the Mexican coast on October 2, Hernan intensified into a hurricane. Six hours later, Hernan attained its peak as an 85 mph (140 km/h) Category 1 hurricane on the Saffir-Simpson Hurricane Wind Scale (SSHWS). After weakening somewhat, on 1000 UTC October 3, Hurricane Hernan made landfall near Barra de Navidad, Jalisco, with winds of 75 mph (120 km/h). Only two hours after landfall, Hernan weakened to a tropical storm. By October 4, Tropical Storm Hernan had weakened into a tropical depression, and dissipated over Nayarit on the following day.

As a result of the large amounts of rain, Hurricane Hernan caused moderate flooding. Despite impacting a relatively sparsely populated area of Mexico, no deaths were reported in the country, though one was reported missing. In all, flooding from the storm washed-out highways, disrupted telephone service, caused power outages, and damaged at least 1,000 homes. However, at least 100 injuries were recorded. In addition, the remnants caused flooding in southern Texas, and one person was presumed to have drowned.

Meteorological history

A tropical wave emerged off the west coast of Africa during mid-September and moved westward across the Atlantic Ocean. Even though convection associated with the system increased on two separate occasions, the tropical wave did not develop further. After emerging into the Pacific Ocean, the system entered the Gulf of Tehuantepec on September 28. Meanwhile, deep convection began to consolidate while the cloud pattern continued to improve. By late on September 29, classifications began on the system via the Dvorak technique, a technique used to measure a tropical cyclones intensity. Three hours later, the National Hurricane Center (NHC) initiated advisories on the depression, stating that it was over warm sea surface temperatures and outflow was becoming well-established. Subsequently, it was predicted that the depression would intensify into a hurricane before October 3.

Later on September 30, satellite intensity classifications estimated wind speeds of at least 40 mph (65 km/h). Based on this, the NHC upgraded the depression to Tropical Storm Hernan. By October 1, the atmospheric circulation of Hernan became difficult to locate on infrared satellite imagery. As a result, the NHC reported that it no longer anticipated that Hernan would intensify into a hurricane. Later that day, Hernan strengthened slightly; subsequently, visible satellite images indicated that the center of the storm redeveloped. Most of the computer models anticipated that Hernan would parallel the coast of Mexico, though the Global Dynamics Fluid Model (GDFL) noted that Tropical Storm Hernan would turn sharply northward and eventually make landfall in Mexico. Early on October 2, deep convection began wrapping around the center, and meteorologists noted that an eye feature may have been forming. Subsequently, Hernan also developed very cold cloud tops while tracking slowly to the northwest. 

At 0600 UTC on October 2, it is estimated that Hernan had intensified into a hurricane. Operationally, however, Hernan was not upgraded to a hurricane until nine hours later. The storm strengthened a little more, and at 1200 UTC on October 2, Hernan attained its peak intensity with maximum sustained winds of 85 mph (140 km/h) and a minimum pressure of 980 mbar (hPa); 28.94 inHg. By late on October 2, radar imagery remarked that the northern eye wall was affecting portions of the west coast of Mexico. Shortly thereafter, the eye of Hernan became less distinct on satellite images. By 0900 UTC on October 3, based on data from radars in Cuyutlán, Colima, the NHC reported that Hurricane Hernan had executed a cyclonic loop to the southwest of Manzanillo. About an hour later, Hernan made landfall near Barra de Navidad, with winds of 75 mph (120 km/h).

Hernan rapidly weakened inland, and it was estimated that it had weakened to a tropical storm only two hours after landfall. By 0000 UTC on October 4, Hernan weakened further, and was downgraded to a tropical depression. Shortly thereafter, Hernan re-emerged into the Pacific Ocean, and the NHC noted that possibility for the depression to restrengthen into a tropical storm. Hernan weakened further as a large portion of its circulation remained on land, while the low-level center became difficult to locate. By 2100 UTC October 4, satellite images and surface reports indicated that Hernan had degenerated into a broad area of low pressure. Hernan finally dissipated at 0000 UTC the next day while centered over Nayarit.

Preparations and Impact

Thirty-six hours after formation, on October 1, a tropical storm warning was issued from Acapulco,  to Manzanillo. Early on the following day, a hurricane watch was put into effect from Zihuatanejo, Guerrero, to Manzanillo, . Three hours later, the watch was upgraded to a hurricane warning. At 1500 UTC on that same day, a tropical storm warning was issued from Manzanillo, to San Blas, Nayarit. By 0300 UTC on October 3, the hurricane warning was extended from Cabo Corrientes, Jalisco to San Blas; the tropical storm warning was also extended, and included areas between Mazatlán and San Blas. As the storm rapidly weakened inland, all watches and warnings in effect were discontinued midday on October 3.

Much of Jalisco was drenched with rain for nearly 12 consecutive hours, resulting in flooding. Country-wide; however, the highest total was recorded in Petacalco and La Union, with  being measured at both locations. Along the coasts of Colima and Jalisco, waves caused by Hernan were not as large, reaching 13 ft (3.9 m) in height. High winds were also recorded.

Because the storm made landfall in a sparsely populated area, no deaths were reported by the NHC. However, one boy was swept away in the Uxpana River and was thus reported missing. Due to flooding caused by the storm, three rivers in Veracruz overflowed their banks. Flooding from the storm also washed-out portions of two Mexico highways. Furthermore, telephone service was interrupted and power outages occurred. Around 1,000 homes were damaged or destroyed and 100 people were injured. Overall, damage from the system was not widespread.

After dissipating, the remnants of Hernan, in combination with a low pressure area that eventually became Tropical Storm Josephine, brought heavy downpours to southern Texas. Rainfall reached  in Brownsville, which caused street flooding and forced several families to evacuate their homes. In addition, coastal flooding was reported in the town of South Padre Island. As a result of heavy rainfall, a flash flood watch and warning were issued for Cameron, Hidalgo, Kenedy, and Willacy Counties. One boy in Brownsville was classified as missing and later presumed to have drowned during the storm.

See also

Other storms of the same name
List of Category 1 Pacific hurricanes
Hurricane Carlos (2015)
Hurricane Max (2017)

References

External links
Monthly Weather Review
Hurricane Hernan Advisory Archive

Hernan
Hernan
Hernan
Hurricane Hernan